Savušun (also spelled Savushun) is a 1969 Persian novel by Iranian writer Simin Daneshvar. It is the first novel in Persian written by a female author. The story is about the life of a landowning family in Shiraz faced to the occupation of Iran during World War II. Savušun has sold over five hundred thousand copies in Iran.

Savušun is "groundbreaking" and highly acclaimed work in contemporary Persian literature, with both literary and popular success within and outside Iran. The novel has been translated to English and 16 other languages. When writing about the novel's importance, critic Kaveh Bissari describing an exact translation by M.R. Ghanoonparvar in 1990 and the version A Persian Requiem by Roxane Zand in 1991.

Daneshvar uses folklore and myth in Savušun. Linguistically, savušun is a corruption of Siyâvašun, which refers to the traditional mourning for Siyâvaš, a hero in the Šâhnâme.

See also
Siyâvaš

References

External links
Savushun on Iranica
Critics on Savushun 
Review of Savushun 
سووشون 
سووشون (in Persian)

Persian-language novels
1969 novels
Political novels
Iranian novels
Novels set in Iran